Cyperus intricatus is a species of sedge that is native to southern parts of Central America and northern parts of South America.

See also 
 List of Cyperus species

References 

intricatus
Plants described in 1824
Flora of Costa Rica
Flora of Argentina
Flora of Brazil
Flora of Paraguay
Flora of Uruguay
Flora of Venezuela
Taxa named by Heinrich Schrader